The Monastery of Saint Naum is an Eastern Orthodox monastery in North Macedonia, named after the medieval Bulgarian writer and enlightener Saint Naum who founded it.

The Lake Ohrid area, including St Naum, is one of the most popular tourist destinations in North Macedonia.

History
The monastery was established in the Bulgarian Empire in 905 by St Naum of Ohrid himself. St Naum is also buried in the church.

Since the 16th century, a Greek school had functioned in the monastery. The monastery had close ties with the printing house of Moscopole, a former prosperous Aromanian city now in Albania. The area where the monastery of St Naum lies belonged to Albania for a short period from 1912 until June 28, 1925, when Zog of Albania ceded it to Yugoslavia as a result of negotiations between Albania and Yugoslavia and as a gesture of goodwill.

In the arts
Rebecca West devoted a chapter of Black Lamb and Grey Falcon to her visit to Sveti Naum, which occurred in 1937.

Gallery

References

External links

 360macedonia.com Virtual Panoramas of St. Naum in Ohrid
 Saint Naum Photo Essay

Macedonian Orthodox monasteries
Christian monasteries established in the 10th century
Eastern Orthodox monasteries in North Macedonia
Byzantine church buildings in North Macedonia
Medieval Bulgarian Orthodox church buildings
Ohrid Municipality
Golden Age of medieval Bulgarian culture
Archbishopric of Ohrid
Religious buildings and structures completed in 905